Golovsky is a rural locality (a khutor) in Dubovskoye Rural Settlement, Uryupinsky District, Volgograd Oblast, Russia. The population was 186 as of 2010. There are 2 streets.

Geography 
Golovsky is located 28 km south of Uryupinsk (the district's administrative centre) by road. Olkhovsky is the nearest rural locality.

References 

Rural localities in Uryupinsky District